Yeni Dizaxlı is a village and municipality in the Qabala Rayon of Azerbaijan. It has a population of 2,110.

References

Populated places in Qabala District